HMS Forester was a British Royal Navy 10-gun Cherokee-class brig-sloop ordered on 23 May 1826, laid down in September 1830, and launched on 28 August 1832 at Chatham Dockyard. On 14 February 1833, she ran aground on a reef off St Martin's, Isles of Scilly, with the loss of a crew member. She was later refloated and towed by the paddle sloop-of-war  to Plymouth, Devon, England, where she was paid off in ordinary. She was sold in 1843.

References

 

 

1832 ships
Ships built in Chatham
Cherokee-class brig-sloops
Maritime incidents in February 1833